Willie Fry, Jr. (February 23, 1955 – July 10, 1998) was an American football player who played for the Pittsburgh Steelers in 1978 and 1980. He was selected by the Steelers in the second round of the 1978 NFL Draft. He earned two Super Bowl rings with the Pittsburgh Steelers in Super Bowl XIII and Super Bowl XIV. He played college football at University of Notre Dame. He died of a heart attack on July 10, 1998 in New York City.

References

1955 births
1998 deaths
American football defensive ends
American football defensive tackles
Notre Dame Fighting Irish football players
Pittsburgh Steelers players
Players of American football from Memphis, Tennessee